Odd Pettersen (29 December 1926 – 6 July 2008) was a Norwegian footballer. He played in one match for the Norway national football team in 1954.

References

External links
 
 

1926 births
2008 deaths
Norwegian footballers
Norway international footballers
Place of birth missing
Association football midfielders
Sarpsborg FK players